Autoba versicolor, the flower webber, sometimes included in the genus Eublemma, is a species of moth of the family Erebidae. It was described by Francis Walker in 1863, from material collected by Alfred Russel Wallace in Sarawak on the island of Borneo. It is the type species of its genus.

Description
The caterpillar has a light brown head and greenish yellow body, while adults have purplish-pink to light orange wings.

Ecology
In the larval stage, this species is a pest of flowering crops, webbing together and eating flowers and young leaves, and creating bore holes in flower stalks.

References

Boletobiinae
Moths described in 1864
Taxa named by Francis Walker (entomologist)
Moths of Borneo